Dvorište is a village located in the Berovo Municipality of North Macedonia.

Demographics
According to the 2002 census, the village had a total of 757 inhabitants. Ethnic groups in the village include:

Macedonians 757

References

Villages in Berovo Municipality